Rhopobota symbolias is a species of moth of the family Tortricidae. It is found in China (Hubei, Hunan, Guangxi, Guizhou) and India.

References

Moths described in 1912
Eucosmini